The 1887 Tipperary Senior Hurling Championship was the inaugural staging of the Tipperary Senior Hurling Championship since its establishment by the Tipperary County Board.

Thurles won the championship after a 0-03 to 0-00 defeat of North Tipperary in the final. It was their first ever championship title.

References

Tipperary
Tipperary Senior Hurling Championship